Polymetallic nodules, also called manganese nodules, are mineral concretions on the sea bottom formed of concentric layers of iron and manganese hydroxides around a core. As nodules can be found in vast quantities, and contain valuable metals, deposits have been identified as a potential economic interest.

Their surface textures vary from smooth to rough. They frequently have botryoidal (mammillated or knobby) texture and vary from spherical in shape to typically oblate, sometimes prolate, or are otherwise irregular. The bottom surface, buried in sediment, is generally rougher than the top due to a different type of growth.

Occurrence
Nodules lie on the seabed sediment, often partly or completely buried. They vary greatly in abundance, in some cases touching one another and covering more than 70% of the sea floor surface. The total amount of polymetallic nodules on the sea floor was estimated at 500 billion tons by Alan A. Archer of the London Geological Museum in 1981. 

Polymetallic nodules are found in both shallow (e.g. the Baltic Sea) and deeper waters (e.g. the central Pacific), even in lakes, and are thought to have been a feature of the seas and oceans at least since the deep oceans oxidised in the Ediacaran period over 540 million years ago.

Polymetallic nodules were discovered in 1868 in the Kara Sea, in the Arctic Ocean of Siberia. During the scientific expeditions of HMS Challenger (1872–1876), they were found to occur in most oceans of the world.

Their composition varies by location, and sizeable deposits have been found in the following areas:
 Penrhyn Basin near within the Cook Islands.
 North central Pacific Ocean in a region called the Clarion Clipperton Zone (CCZ) roughly midway between Hawaii and Clipperton Islands.
 Peru Basin in the southeast Pacific, and
 Southern tropical Indian Ocean in a region termed the Indian Ocean Nodule Field (IONF) roughly 500 km SE of Diego Garcia Island.
In the Eastern Pacific, including the area around Juan Fernández Islands and the abyssal plain offshore Loa River.

The International Seabed Authority estimates that the total amount of nodules in the Clarion Clipperton Zone exceeds 21 billions of tons (Bt), containing about 5.95 Bt of manganese, 0.27 Bt of nickel, 0.23 Bt of copper and 0.05 Bt of cobalt.

All of these deposits are in international waters apart from the Penrhyn Basin, which lies within the exclusive economic zone of the Cook Islands.

Growth and composition

On the seabed the abundance of nodules varies and is likely controlled by the thickness and stability of a geochemically active layer that forms at the seabed. Pelagic sediment type and seabed bathymetry (or geomorphology) likely influence the characteristics of the geochemically active layer.

Nodule growth is one of the slowest of all known geological phenomena, on the order of a centimeter over several million years.  Several processes are hypothesized to be involved in the formation of nodules, including the precipitation of metals from seawater, the remobilization of manganese in the water column (diagenetic), the derivation of metals from hot springs associated with volcanic activity (hydrothermal), the decomposition of basaltic debris by seawater (halmyrolitic) and the precipitation of metal hydroxides through the activity of microorganisms (biogenic). The sorption of divalent cations such as Mn2+, Fe2+, Co2+,  Ni2+, and Cu2+ at the surface of Mn- and Fe-oxyhydroxides, known to be strong sorbents, also plays a main role in the accumulation of these transition metals in the manganese nodules. These processes (precipitation, sorption, surface complexation, surface precipitation, incorporation by formation of solid solutions...) may operate concurrently or they may follow one another during the formation of a nodule.

Manganese nodules are essentially composed of hydrated phyllomanganates. These are layered Mn-oxide minerals with interlayers containing water molecules in variable quantities. They strongly interact with trace metals (Co2+,  Ni2+) because of the octahedral vacancies present in their layers. The particular properties of phyllomanganates explain the role they play in many geochemical concentration processes. They incorporate traces of transition metals mainly via cation exchange in their interlayer like clay minerals and surface complexation by formation of inner sphere complexes at the oxide surface as it is also the case with hydrous ferric oxides, HFO. Slight variations in their crystallographic structure and mineralogical composition may result in considerable changes in their chemical reactivity.

The mineral composition of manganese-bearing minerals is dependent on how the nodules are formed; sedimentary nodules, which have a lower Mn2+ content than diagenetic, are dominated by Fe-vernadite, Mn-feroxyhyte, and asbolane-buserite while diagenetic nodules are dominated by buserite I, birnessite, todorokite, and asbolane-buserite. The growth types termed diagenetic and hydrogenetic reflect suboxic and oxic growth, which in turn could relate to periods of interglacial and glacial climate. It has been estimated that suboxic-diagenetic type 2 layers make up about 50–60% of the chemical inventory of the nodules from the Clarion Clipperton Zone (CCZ) whereas oxic-hydrogenetic type 1 layers comprise about 35–40%. The remaining part (5–10%) of the nodules consists of incorporated sediment particles occurring along cracks and pores.

The chemical composition of nodules varies according to the type of manganese minerals and the size and characteristics of their core. Those of greatest economic interest contain manganese (27–30 wt. %), nickel (1.25–1.5 wt. %), copper (1–1.4 wt. %) and cobalt (0.2–0.25 wt. %). Other constituents include iron (6 wt. %), silicon (5 wt. %) and aluminium (3 wt. %), with lesser amounts of calcium, sodium, magnesium, potassium, titanium and barium, along with hydrogen and oxygen as well as water of crystallization and free water. In a given manganese nodule, there is one part of iron oxide for every two parts of manganese dioxide.

A wide range of trace elements and trace minerals are found in nodules with many of these incorporated from the seabed sediment, which itself includes particles carried as dust from all over the planet before settling to the seabed.

Proposed mining
Interest in the potential exploitation of polymetallic nodules generated a great deal of activity among prospective mining consortia in the 1960s and 1970s.  Almost half a billion dollars was invested in identifying potential deposits and in research and development of technology for mining and processing nodules. These initial undertakings were carried out primarily by four multinational consortia composed of companies from the United States, Canada, the United Kingdom, West Germany, Belgium, the Netherlands, Italy, Japan, and two groups of private companies and agencies from France and Japan. There were also three publicly sponsored entities from the Soviet Union, India and China.

In the late 1970s, two of the international joint ventures collected several hundred-ton quantities of manganese nodules from the abyssal plains ( + depth) of the eastern equatorial Pacific Ocean. Significant quantities of nickel (the primary target) as well as copper and cobalt were subsequently extracted from this "ore" using both pyrometallurgical and hydrometallurgical methods. In the course of these projects, a number of ancillary developments evolved, including the use of near-bottom towed side-scan sonar array to assay the nodule population density on the abyssal silt while simultaneously performing a sub-bottom profile with a derived, vertically oriented, low-frequency acoustic beam. Since then, deep sea technology has improved significantly: including widespread and low cost use of navigation technology such as Global Positioning System (GPS) and ultra-short baseline (USBL); survey technology such as multibeam echosounder (MBES) and autonomous underwater vehicles (AUV); and intervention technology including remotely operated underwater vehicle (ROV) and high power umbilical cables. There is also improved technology that could be used in mining including pumps, tracked and screw drive rovers, rigid and flexible drilling risers, and ultra-high-molecular-weight polyethylene rope. Mining is considered to be similar to the potato harvest on land, which involves mining a field partitioned into long, narrow strips. The mining support vessel follows the mining route of the seafloor mining tools, picking up the about potato-sized nodules from the seafloor.

In recent times, nickel and other metal supply has needed to turn to higher cost deposits in order to meet increased demand, and commercial interest in nodules has revived. The International Seabed Authority has granted new exploration contracts and is progressing development of a Mining Code for The Area, with most interest being in the Clarion Clipperton Zone.

Since 2011, a number of commercial companies have received exploration contracts. These include subsidiaries of larger companies like Lockheed Martin, DEME (Global Sea Mineral Resources, GSR), Keppel Corporation and China Minmetals, and smaller companies like Nauru Ocean Resources and Tonga Offshore Mining.

In July 2021, Nauru announced a plan to exploit nodules in this area, which requires the International Seabed Authority, who regulates mining in international waters, to finalize mining regulations by July 2023. Environmentalists have criticized this move on the grounds that too little is known about seabed ecosystems to understand the potential impacts of deep-sea mining, and some of the major tech companies, including Samsung and BMW, have committed to avoid using metals derived from nodules.

Ecology
Very little is known about deep sea ecosystems or the potential impacts of deep-sea mining. Polymetallic nodule fields are hotspots of abundance and diversity for a highly vulnerable abyssal fauna, much of which lives attached to nodules or in the sediment immediately beneath it.

Nodule mining could affect tens of thousands of square kilometers of these deep sea ecosystems, and ecosystems take millions of years to recover. It causes habitat alteration, direct mortality of benthic creatures, or smothering of filter feeders by sediment. Experimental studies in the 1990s concluded in part that trial mining at a reasonable scale would likely help best constrain real impacts from any commercial mining.

See also

 
 
 
 
 
 
 
 Ferromanganese nodules

References

Further reading
 
 Abramowski, T. (2016). Value chain of deep seabed mining, Book: Deep sea mining value chain: organization, technology and development, pp 9–18, Interoceanmetal Joint Organization
 
 
 
 
 
 
 Thomas, Elin, et al. (2021) "A Global Red List for Hydrothermal Vent Molluscs." Frontiers in Marine Science | www.frontiersin.org https://doi.org/10.3389/fmars.2021.713022

External links
 Report on a World Almanac 1997 documentary Universe Beneath the Sea claiming evidence of rapid formation
 The International Seabed Authority

Cobalt minerals
Copper minerals
Manganese minerals
Natural resources
Nickel minerals
Oceanography
Underwater mining